All Wrapped Up Vol. 2 is a 7-track Christmas-themed extended play featuring musical artists signed to Hollywood Records singing their own versions of holiday songs. It was released on October 30, 2009.

Track listing

References

2009 EPs
2009 Christmas albums
Christmas compilation albums
2009 compilation albums
Hollywood Records compilation albums
Hollywood Records EPs
Pop rock compilation albums
Pop rock Christmas albums